Kei Nishikori defeated Daniil Medvedev in the final, 6–4, 3–6, 6–2 to win the men's singles tennis title at the 2019 Brisbane International. The win ended Nishikori's streak of nine consecutive finals lost on the ATP Tour.

Nick Kyrgios was the defending champion, but lost in the second round to Jérémy Chardy.

Seeds
The top four seeds receive a bye into the second round.

Draw

Finals

Top half

Bottom half

Qualifying

Seeds

Qualifiers

Lucky loser

Qualifying draw

First qualifier

Second qualifier

Third qualifier

Fourth qualifier

References
 
Singles Draw
Qualifying Draw

Men's Singles
2019 ATP Tour